Środula is a former village in Poland, now the northern district of the town of Sosnowiec, Poland.

Edward Gierek, a former leader of Poland (the 4th First Secretary of the Polish United Workers' Party) during the communist era, is buried there.

History

1914 Środula becomes part of the city of Sosnowiec

1935 Trams start going to Środula

1940 A prisoner of war camp was created in Środula (around Staszica)

1942 The creation of the Środula ghetto for Jews

1943 The liquidation of the ghetto - the mass deportation of Jews to extermination camps

1952 The separation from the parish Zagórska of the Exaltation of the Holy Cross in Środula

1970s The demolition of most of the old architecture Środula and to be replaced with pre-fabricated apartment blocks

1980 Commissioning of a tramway line connecting with the city center

1982 Commissioning of a tramway line linking Środula to Zagórze

1991 The beginning of the adaptation of the former State Agricultural Farm into what is now a park and the venue of numerous athletic activities and cycling

1999 The opening of the first hypermarket in the area

Park Środula

Park Środula (Środula Park) is one of Sosnowiec's parks, on a hillside with panoramic views of the city.

Replacing a former state owned collective farm, the park was opened in 1991 after extensive redevelopment. Further developments from 2002 to 2005 include an artificial ski slope and the addition of bicycle paths.

The park hosts a number of sporting events including athletics competitions, cycling events (including the Grand Prix of Sosnowiec in mountain biking), and school sports competitions.

Sosnowiec
Neighbourhoods in Silesian Voivodeship
Holocaust locations in Poland